Caesium acetate or cesium acetate is an ionic caesium compound with the molecular formula CH3COOCs. It is a white solid that may be formed by the reaction of caesium hydroxide or caesium carbonate with acetic acid.

Uses 
It is used in organic synthesis. One example is in the Perkin synthesis: the formation of unsaturated cinnamic-type acids by the condensation of aromatic aldehydes with fatty acids. Replacement of the commonly used sodium acetate with caesium acetate has been shown to improve yields by up to 10 times.

It is often used to invert secondary alcohols, first by direct SN2 substitution of the hydroxyl group with acetate, which is then converted back to a hydroxyl group.

Caesium acetate is occasionally used instead of caesium formate in petroleum drilling fluids.

References

Further reading
.

External links
Caesium acetate factsheet from Chemetall GmbH

Caesium compounds
Acetates
Reagents for organic chemistry